Vatica sarawakensis is a tree in the family Dipterocarpaceae. It is named for Sarawak, part of the species' range in Borneo.

Description
The inflorescences bear cream flowers.

Distribution and habitat
Vatica sarawakensis is endemic to Borneo.

Conservation
Vatica sarawakensis has been assessed as vulnerable on the IUCN Red List. It is threatened mainly by logging for its timber. Land conversion for plantations, including for palm oil, also threatens the species.

References

sarawakensis
Endemic flora of Borneo
Plants described in 1891